Patrasayer Mahavidyalaya, established in 2005, is the general degree college in Patrasayer, Bankura district. It offers undergraduate courses in arts. It is affiliated to  Bankura University.

Accreditation
The college is recognized by the University Grants Commission (UGC).

See also

References

External links 
Patrasayer Mahavidyalaya

Universities and colleges in Bankura district
Colleges affiliated to Bankura University
Educational institutions established in 2005
2005 establishments in West Bengal